Mama's Little Pirate is a 1934 Our Gang short comedy film directed by Gus Meins.  It was the 132nd Our Gang short (44th talking episode) that was released.

Plot
Spanky's father reads a newspaper article about treasures found at a nearby cave during breakfast with the family. This inspires Spanky to explore another nearby cave with the gang for more treasures. The cave is too dark so Spanky goes back home to get a flashlight. Spanky's mother catches him and forbids him to hunt for the treasure, going as far as to send him to his room when he refuses to listen.

Confined to his room, Spanky falls asleep and in his dream argues with his "inner self", who advises him to disobey his mother and join the rest of the gang in their search for buried treasure. Though the kids miraculously unearth a fortune in gold and jewels, their triumph nearly turns to disaster when they encounter a surly giant (Tex Madsen). During the height of the trouble they've found, Spanky wakes up from his dream.

Notes
Mama's Little Pirate is the first Our Gang fantasy outing. The film was enhanced by Leroy Shield's unique background music composition "Cascadia", originally written for the "Boy Friends" comedy Air Tight (1931).

Leroy Shield's music composition was "Good Old Days" in the opening titles and "We're going to arrowhead" was in the end title.

The cave was a set from the 1934 film Babes in Toyland that was also directed by Gus Meins.

Cast

The Gang
 Matthew Beard as Stymie
 Scotty Beckett as Scotty
 George McFarland as Spanky
 Billie Thomas as Buckwheat
 Jerry Tucker as Jerry
 Marylin Bourne as Little girl
 Gilbert Hullett as Our Gang member
 Paul Rodriguez as Our Gang member

Additional cast
 Billy Bletcher as Giant (voice)
 Claudia Dell as Spanky's mother
 Tex Madsen as Giant 
 Joe Young as Spanky's father (as Joe Young)

See also
 Our Gang filmography

References

External links

1934 films
1934 comedy films
American black-and-white films
Films directed by Gus Meins
Hal Roach Studios short films
Our Gang films
1934 short films
1930s American films